St Ambrose's School, Brunswick was a Roman Catholic primary school located in , Victoria, a suburb of Melbourne and was part of a parish complex which included a church, a hall and a school for boys and one for girls each using the same or similar school name. The school was active between  until its closure in 2008.

History
Following the discovery of gold in Victoria in the 1850s and the granting of statehood to the Colony, the population of Melbourne rose quickly from 177 at the time of settlement in 1836 to 80,000 in 1854 and just seven years later that figure had risen to 140,000. The needs of the ever-expanding population led to the establishment of places of worship, hospitals and schools.

The suburb of Brunswick was no different and a school building, part of the St Ambrose Church complex, costing £1000 was completed by the middle of 1885 and opened formally around that time. This building later became the St. Ambrose's Hall.

In 1890 St. Ambrose's was declared a Parish in its own right led by Father Luby. The school enrolment had increased to 330 and the need for finances to expand the services offered by the parish was rising.

By 1906 the total school enrolment had risen to 1021 students and around £6000 had been spent in the preceding 16 years. Since 1899 the school had been led by Charles Xavier O'Driscoll. When O'Driscoll resigned in 1911 he went on to become Inspector of Catholic Schools for the region.

The girls school
St Ambrose's Girls' School began operating in the original church building and the curriculum included singing, drawing and French. By 1906 the running of the school had been taken over by the Sisters of Mercy. The Sisters travelled along Sydney Road from their convent in North Coburg daily and in 1913 Sister Mary Claver was head of the girls school. Around 1922 the daily average attendance had risen to 500 pupils.

The boys school
In the early years the boys shared the same building with the girls but were still being taught by lay teachers in 1906. In 1917 a new building, costing £4000, was formally opened a short distance from the church itself. Also known as St. Ambrose's Boys School, Brunswick, members of the Congregation of Christian Brothers taught the boys and assumed control of this school. At the time of opening it had an enrolment of 300, its first headmaster was Bro. Keniry.

The boys school continued to be assisted by the Christian Brothers for some time as they had also established St Joseph's CBC North Melbourne in the neighbouring suburb of North Melbourne. St Joseph's was to become the residence of the teaching Brothers serving St Mary's Primary School, West Melbourne, St Joseph's and St George's School in Carlton, and for a time, St. Ambrose's.

Later years
St Ambrose's School closed at the end of 2008 with the local parish children now attending Our Lady Help of Christians Primary School. Of the original school buildings only St. Ambrose's Hall and St. Ambrose's Community Centre remain in parish hands. Both these buildings were once used as a school.

Notable alumni
 Lt. Henry Noel Boyle – WW1, wounded in action during Gallipoli Campaign, also served in WW2
 Cpl. John Terrence Clarke – WW1, severely wounded in action
 Pvt. Thomas Conroy 14th. Bn. – WW1, killed in action during Gallipoli Campaign
 Claude Curtin – Australian rules football
 John Curtin – Past Prime Minister of Australia
 Lt. John James Daley – WW1, awarded Military Cross, Dux of school
 Pvt. Edward Patrick Dorian – WW2, prisoner of war
 Maurie Johnson – Australian rules football
 Joseph Leslie O'Rourke – WW1
 Bob Santamaria – Social commentator
 Pvt. Christopher Tomlinson (alias Sauer) – WW2, wounded in action
 Drv. Francis Tyrrell – WW2, Killed in action

References

External links
 A brief history of St. Ambrose's Church

Further reading
 
 The story of Ted Dorian as a POW

Defunct Catholic schools in Australia
Former Congregation of Christian Brothers schools in Australia
Defunct boys' schools in Australia
Defunct girls' schools in Australia
Educational institutions established in 1885
1885 establishments in Australia
Educational institutions disestablished in 2008
2008 establishments in Australia